Joe Matson (6 March 1881 – 4 January 1937) was an American racecar driver from Brighton, Massachusetts (now a neighborhood of Boston) who raced in the second Indianapolis 500.

Indy 500 results

References

1881 births
1937 deaths
AAA Championship Car drivers
Indianapolis 500 drivers
Racing drivers from Boston
Racing drivers from Massachusetts
Sportspeople from Boston